Ivan Nedeljković (born 15 May 1978) is a Serbian former professional footballer who played as a attacking midfielder. He is the current manager of AEK Athens U17 team.

Playing career
Born in Belgrade, Serbia, Nedeljković began his playing career in Serbia with Rad Beograd before moving to Greece to play with Karditsa F.C. in July 1998. He had a brief spell with Panelefsiniakos before joining Ethnikos Asteras for whom he would make nine Alpha Ethniki appearances. He would spend most of the rest of his career in Greek football, including stints with Panegialios, Paniliakos and Rodos. He would additional appearances in the Greek Super League with Larissa and Egaleo.

References

1978 births
Living people

Serbian footballers
Association football forwards
FK Rad players
Ethnikos Asteras F.C. players
Paniliakos F.C. players
Athlitiki Enosi Larissa F.C. players
Egaleo F.C. players
Kavala F.C. players
Rodos F.C. players
Expatriate footballers in Greece
AEK F.C. non-playing staff
Panegialios F.C. players
Panelefsiniakos F.C. players